GTR 2 – FIA GT Racing Game is a sports car racing simulator developed by Blimey! Games and SimBin Studios (later Sector3 Studios) and published by 10tacle Publishing for the x86 PC. it is a sequel to GTR. The game simulates the official 2003 and 2004 FIA GT Championship racing series, with more than 140 high detailed cars from the  GT and NGT classes as well as 34 different track-layouts. Since its release in September 2006, the game has received widespread acclaim. Extending the physics engine from GTR, it features realistic physics including dynamic lighting, damage modeling, 3 different game modes (Novice, Semi-Pro and Simulation), open practice, race weekend, championships, time trials, endurance race events (including Spa 24 Hours) and Driving school.

Modding
One of the reasons GTR 2 has been so popular is the ability to create custom content for the game. This has led to a large community of players who create new vehicles and tracks to race with.

Reception

IGN's award for Best PC Racing Game of 2006.
GameSpot's award for Best Driving Game of 2006 as well as the Best Game Nobody Played of 2006.
GameSpy rated it the 9th best PC game of 2006.
Metacritic's  #3 Best PC Game of 2006.

The editors of Computer Games Magazine presented GTR 2 with their 2006 "Best Simulation" award. It was a runner-up for their list of the year's top 10 computer games. It also won PC Gamer USs 2006 "Best Racing Game" award.

References

External links
GTR 2 official website
 

10tacle Studios games
2006 video games
FIA GT Championship
Multiplayer and single-player video games
Racing simulators
Racing video games
SimBin Studios games
Video game sequels
Video games developed in Sweden
Video games developed in the United Kingdom
Video games scored by Stephen Baysted
Video games set in Belgium
Video games set in China
Video games set in France
Video games set in Germany
Video games set in Italy
Video games set in Portugal
Video games set in Spain
Video games set in Sweden
Video games set in the Czech Republic
Video games set in the United Arab Emirates
Video games set in the United Kingdom
Windows games
Windows-only games